The men's doubles of the 2007 ECM Prague Open tournament was played on clay in Prague, Czech Republic.

Petr Pála and David Škoch were the defending champions, but competed this year with different partners.

Pála teamed up with Pavel Vízner and lost in first round to Lukáš Dlouhý and Tomáš Zíb.

Škoch teamed up with Leoš Friedl and lost in the final 6–4, 6–2 to tournament winners Tomáš Cibulec and Jordan Kerr.

Seeds

Draw

Draw

External Links
 Main Draw 

2007 - Men's Doubles